Soufiane El Bakkali (born 7 January 1996) is a Moroccan male runner specializing in the 3000 metres steeplechase. He is the 2020 Tokyo Olympic champion, having previously finished fourth at the 2016 Rio Olympics. At the World Athletics Championships, El Bakkali won the gold medal in 2022, silver in 2017 and bronze in 2019. He also placed third at the 2019 African Games and second at the 2018 African Championships.

El Bakkali was the 2022 Diamond League champion in his specialist event.

Career
At age 18, Soufiane El Bakkali placed fourth in the 3000 m steeplechase at the 2014 World Junior Championships in Athletics, and then made his senior debut at the 2014 African Championships in Athletics, taking tenth in the event. He also competed in cross country running and was 18th as a junior at the 2015 IAAF World Cross Country Championships.

He gained selection for Morocco at the 2016 Summer Olympics after a personal best of 8:14.41 minutes to take fourth in his specialist event at the Herculis meeting. At the Rio Olympics, El Bakkali improved his personal best further to 8:14.35 minutes and finished fourth.

He won the silver medal at the 2017 World Championships held in London in a time of 8:14.49 behind only Conseslus Kipruto who ran 8:14.12. Two years later, at the World Championships in Doha, Qatar El Bakkali earned a bronze with a season's best of 8:03.76 behind Kipruto (8:01.35) and Lamecha Girma (8:01.36).

On 3 September 2020, he won the 1500 metres race at the 14th International Marseille Athletics Meeting in France.

El Bakkali qualified to represent Morocco at the 2020 Tokyo Olympics where he won the gold medal in his signature event with a time of 8:08.90, ahead of Girma in 8:10.38 and Benjamin Kigen (8:11.45). He thus became the first non-Kenyan-born athlete to win the title since Poland’s Bronislaw Malinowski did so at the 1980 Olympics in Moscow, and the first non-Kenyan gold medallist at the Olympics or World Championships since 1987.

On 18 September 2021, El Bakkali won his speciality event at the Kip Keino Classic meeting in Nairobi, Kenya, finishing with an 8:21.20 clocking.

On 18 July 2022 at the World Athletics Championships held in Eugene, Oregon, El Bakkali became the world champion, winning the gold medal in the 3000 m steeplechase with a time of 8:25.13 ahead of Lamecha Girma (8:26.01) and Conseslus Kipruto (8:27.92). In September at the Diamond League final in Zürich, he claimed his first Diamond Trophy. Just three days later, he capped his fine season with an African best in the 2000 m steeplechase, running 5:14.06 at the Hanžeković Memorial in Zagreb to move to third on the world all-time list for the event. El Bakkali was undefeated and ran the fastest time in the world that season, clocking 7:58.28 at Rabat Diamond League. In November, he was shortlisted for the World Athletics Male Athlete of the Year award.

Achievements

International competitions

Circuit wins and titles
 Diamond League champion 3000 m steeplechase:  2022
 3000 metres steeplechase wins, other events specified in parenthesis
 2017: Stockholm Bauhaus-galan, Rabat Meeting
 2018: Monaco Herculis ( PB) 
 2019: Doha Diamond League (WL), Monaco Herculis (WL), Meeting de Paris
 2020: Monaco (WL) 
 2021: Rome Golden Gala in Florence
 2022: Doha (WL), Rabat (WL ), Lausanne Athletissima, Zürich Weltklasse
 World Continental Tour
 3000 metres steeplechase wins, other events specified in parenthesis
 2022: Zagreb Hanžeković Memorial (2000 m st.)

Personal bests
 1500 metres – 3:31.95 (Doha 2021)
 2000 metres indoor – 5:00.55 (Liévin 2019)
 3000 metres –	7:37.18 (Chorzów 2021)
 3000 metres indoor – 7:41.88 (Liévin 2018)
 5000 metres – 13:47.76 (Rabat 2014)
 5000 metres indoor – 13:10.60 (Birmingham 2017) 
 2000 metres steeplechase – 5:14.06 (Zagreb 2022)  African best
 3000 metres steeplechase – 7:58.15 (Monaco 2018)

Awards
 Confederation of African Athletics Best Male Athlete of the Year: 2022

References

External links

 
 
 
 

Living people
1996 births
Moroccan male steeplechase runners
Moroccan male middle-distance runners
Olympic athletes of Morocco
Athletes (track and field) at the 2016 Summer Olympics
World Athletics Championships medalists
World Athletics Championships athletes for Morocco
Mediterranean Games gold medalists for Morocco
Mediterranean Games medalists in athletics
Athletes (track and field) at the 2018 Mediterranean Games
Athletes (track and field) at the 2019 African Games
African Games bronze medalists for Morocco
People from Fez, Morocco
Mediterranean Games gold medalists in athletics
African Games medalists in athletics (track and field)
Olympic gold medalists for Morocco
Olympic gold medalists in athletics (track and field)
Medalists at the 2020 Summer Olympics
Athletes (track and field) at the 2020 Summer Olympics